Santa Magdalena de Polpís is a town and municipality in the Baix Maestrat comarca, province of Castelló, Valencian Community, Spain.

The town is located inland in a flat valley between the two mountain ranges of Serra d'Irta and Serra de les Talaies. It is a rural dryland farming town with only marginal industrial activity, where the main cultivation is olive, almond and carob trees, as well as some orange trees in irrigated patches. There is no river in the valley, instead the water emerges in natural ponds known as basses.

The main celebration in Santa Magdalena de Polpís is the Festes patronals in honor of Saint Mary Magdalene.

History
Like neighboring Alcalà de Xivert its castle was an important bulwark in Moorish times and a village developed at the feet of the castle, eventually giving origin to the present-day town.

Santa Magdalena de Polpís suffered much during the Spanish Civil War (1936–1939) when the fascist troops tried to split the Spanish Republican government territory in two and reach the Mediterranean coast cutting across the Talaies.

References

External links

 Web de Santa Magdalena de Polpís
 Polpís, terra cremada - The Civil War in Santa Magdalena de Polpís, political, social and historical context
 Institut Valencià d'Estadística.
 Portal de la Direcció General d'Administració Local de la Generalitat.

Municipalities in the Province of Castellón
Baix Maestrat